Notre Dame Football on NBC is an American presentation of college football games involving the Notre Dame Fighting Irish that are produced by NBC Sports, the sports division of the NBC television network in the United States. NBC Sports has broadcast all Notre Dame home games since September 7, 1991.

Since NBC began airing Notre Dame home football games , the network's deal with the university has ensured that all of its home games are on national broadcast television, a unique configuration amongst American sports. Most of the games are televised in the afternoon, usually starting at 3:30 p.m. ET.

Since 2011, at least two games per season are played in primetime, often played at neutral venues for the purposes of recruiting and financial benefits for playing at those sites, a high-profile matchup involving a major opponent, or to schedule around conflicts with other NBC Sports or NBC News programming. On occasion, selected games may be shifted to an NBCUniversal-owned cable channel, such as USA Network, or moved to NBC's over-the-top streaming service Peacock.

History

Prior to 1991
On November 19, 1949, WTVN-TV (now WSYX-TV, channel 6), ABC in Columbus, Ohio provided a telecast of Notre Dame's game against the Iowa Hawkeyes.

Notre Dame soon had an exclusive television deal with the DuMont Television Network starting in 1950. What attracted Notre Dame to DuMont despite receiving higher bids from ABC and NBC, was DuMont's willingness to air educational programs on behalf of Notre Dame along with the football broadcast. This triggered concern from NCAA members that television would hurt attendance. But Notre Dame argued that the contract with DuMont actually increased interest in their football program and the university.

On October 1, 1950, WSB-TV (channel 2), ABC in Atlanta, Georgia broadcast Notre Dame's game against the North Carolina Tar Heels from South Bend, Indiana via a coaxial cable. WBKB (now WBBM-TV, channel 2), CBS in Chicago, Illinois aired Notre Dame's home games live with the aid of a microwave relay system that was fashioned by William C. "Bill" Eddy, Bill Kusack, and Arch Brolly.

But during the majority of this time, Notre Dame's games were syndicated for airing on Saturday nights. The telecasts were typically condensed to a one hour program anchored by Lindsey Nelson.

Notre Dame would next land a television deal with ABC in 1953. It was ABC who would air the "Game of the Century" between Notre Dame and the Michigan State Spartans on November 19, 1966. The game was not shown live on national TV. The agreement between the NCAA and ABC in effect at the time limited each team to one national television appearance and two regional television appearances each season. Notre Dame had used their national TV slot in the season opening game against Purdue. ABC executives did not even want to show the game anywhere but the regional area, but pressure from the West Coast and the South (to the tune of 50,000 letters) made ABC air the game on tape delay.

In 1976, Notre Dame was one of 67 schools to form the College Football Association (CFA) and pool their television rights. However, by the second half of the 1980s, Notre Dame became one of the most valuable and recognizable teams on national television and was unhappy with deals signed by the CFA that emphasized regional games.

In 1986, Notre Dame joined eight independent schools in the East coast in a secondary rights deal with Jefferson-Pilot Communications. In the event that CBS or ESPN passed on airing that week's Notre Dame game, then Jefferson-Pilot's independent stations could broadcast it throughout the country. CBS most notably broadcast the famous "Catholics vs. Convicts" game against the Miami Hurricanes in 1988.

1991–2009
In February 1990, Notre Dame broke away from the CFA and signed a five-year broadcasting contract with NBC beginning in the 1991 season, worth $38 million. The deal surprised the college football world and left many of the other CFA members unhappy with Notre Dame. Notre Dame got half of the $7.6 million that NBC paid for the rights each year of the deal and its opponent received the other half. The last Notre Dame home game to be televised on a network outside of NBC was on November 17, 1990, when the Irish played their final home game of 1990 against Penn State, in a game that was broadcast by ESPN (with Ron Franklin, Gary Danielson, and Neil Lomax on the call).

The network's 1993 broadcast of the game between Florida State Seminoles and Notre Dame (ranked as the #1 and #2 college football teams at the time) is still the most-watched regular season college football game since NBC began carrying the Fighting Irish's games.

In 2009, Notre Dame began to play one home game each year at a neutral site outside of the university's Notre Dame, Indiana campus for recruitment and exposure purposes, which are broadcast nationally on NBC as part of the television deal with 7:30 p.m. Eastern start times under the banner of the Shamrock Series. This was initiated with a late October 2009 game against Washington State at the Alamodome in San Antonio. A November 2010 matchup against Army at Yankee Stadium, which NBC also televised, was also a Notre Dame home game, despite West Point's proximity to the Tri-State area. Notre Dame battled Miami at Soldier Field in 2012 and met Arizona State at Cowboys Stadium in Arlington, Texas in 2013, a year later Notre Dame played Purdue at Lucas Oil Stadium and in 2015, Notre Dame played against Boston College at Fenway Park. As of 2022, the Irish have never lost under the Shamrock Series banner.

2010–2019
Ratings for NBC's Notre Dame game telecasts had slumped to historic lows during the 2011 season, coinciding with average performances of the team on the football field over the past several years; however, the resurgence in the program under Brian Kelly in 2012 has resulted in the network's highest game viewership since 2005.

In 2011, sister channel Versus (now NBCSN) began airing rebroadcasts of past Notre Dame games, including those aired on NBC over the years. Previously via NBC's rights deal, sister cable network Universal HD aired same-week reruns of Notre Dame home games until NBCUniversal's January 2011 merger with Comcast. The deal has also been expanded to cover some games of the university's hockey team. This was further punctuated when numerous weather delays forced a Notre Dame football game against USF to go past the scheduled period and NBC never rejoined the game opting instead to air the movie, when Versus picked up the conclusion of the game.

On April 9, 2013, NBC Sports renewed its broadcasting contract with Notre Dame for ten years through the 2025 season. Double the length of prior contract extension deals, the agreement allows NBC Sports the rights to a minimum of seven home games to be broadcast per season, with NBC Sports Network also acquiring rights to select games beginning in 2016. While most games traditionally are held at 3:30 p.m. Eastern on Saturdays, some games will be held during primetime. Revenue from the deal will continue to aid non-athlete student financial assistance.

On November 21, 2015, NBCSN broadcast its first live Notre Dame game, a neutral site night game against Boston College held at Boston's Fenway Park as part of the Shamrock Series.

On September 8, 2016, NBC announced that all Notre Dame home games during the 2016 season would be broadcast in 4K ultra-high-definition television exclusively on DirecTV.

On September 30, 2017, NBCSN broadcast its second live Notre Dame game, against Miami (OH).

2020–present
Notre Dame's September 19, 2020, game against South Florida was moved to USA Network due to conflicts with the 2020 U.S. Open on NBC. With NBC's usual production unit working the U.S. Open, the broadcast was produced using the university's in-house Notre Dame Studios and Fighting Irish Media unit (in combination with NBC talent, and staff working from NBC Sports' Stamford, Connecticut studios), marking the first time it had worked a regular season Fighting Irish football game.

Notre Dame's double-overtime win against Clemson on November 7, 2020 was NBC's most-watched Notre Dame game since 2005, averaging just over 10 million viewers. This was despite part of the game being pre-empted to USA Network due to coverage of a primetime address by Joe Biden, winner of the 2020 United States presidential election.

On August 4, 2021, NBC announced that the team's 2021 home opener against Toledo would be exclusive to paid subscribers of NBCUniversal's streaming service Peacock, the first Notre Dame home game not to air on terrestrial television since 1990 vs. Air Force.

Personalities

Current
 Jac Collinsworth – play-by-play (2022–present); studio host (2020–2021); sideline reporter (2020)
 Jason Garrett – color commentator (2022–present)
 Zora Stephenson – sideline reporter (2022–present)
 Terry McAulay – rules analyst (2018–present)
 Kathryn Tappen – studio host (2022); sideline reporter (2014–2021)

Former

Play-by-play
 Paul Burmeister (2017 and 2020)
 Don Criqui (1994–1997)
 Dick Enberg (1991, 1993 and 1998–1999)
 Tom Hammond (1992–1997 and 2000–2015)
 Dan Hicks (2002 and 2011–2016) – On November 2, 2002, Hicks filled in for Tom Hammond, who was recovering from heart surgery, in the game against Boston College. 
 Charlie Jones (1993–1997)
 Craig Minervini (2000) – Minervini filled in for Tom Hammond for the September 9, 2000 game against Nebraska, and the following week's game involving Purdue. Hammond was preparing for and subsequently, assigned to work on NBC's coverage of the Summer Olympic telecasts in Sydney, Australia.
 Mike Tirico (2016–2021)

Color commentary
 Drew Brees (2021)
 Todd Christensen (1993)
 Cris Collinsworth (1992–1994)
 Randy Cross (1994–1996)
 Tony Dungy (2020)
 Doug Flutie (2014–2019)
 Pat Haden (1998–2009)
 Paul Maguire (1995)
 Mike Mayock (2010–2014)
 Beasley Reece (1996)
 Phil Simms (1995)
 Bob Trumpy (1993 and 1995–1997)
 Bill Walsh (1991)

Sideline reporters
 John Dockery (1991–1997)
 Alex Flanagan (2007–2013)
 Jim Gray (1998–2001)
 Lewis Johnson (2002–2006)
 O. J. Simpson (1991–1993)

Studio hosts
 Bob Costas (1993)
 Liam McHugh (2013–2019)

Studio analysts
 Dhani Jones (2016)
 Jonathan Vilma (2015)
 Chris Simms (2017–2019)
 Hines Ward (2013–2015)
 Doug Flutie (2020)
 Corey Robinson (2021)

References

External links
 

2000s American television series
2010s American television series
2020s American television series
1991 American television series debuts
College football television series
Football on NBC
NBC original programming
NBCSN shows
Notre Dame Fighting Irish football
Sports telecast series